Daniela Schreiber (born 26 June 1989) is a German swimmer. She competed at the 2012 Summer Olympics in the 100 m, 4 × 100 m and 4 × 200 m freestyle events and finished in 15th, 9th and 11th place, respectively.

Between 2009 and 2012 she won three gold, two silver and five bronze medals at European and world championships, mostly in the 4×50 m and 4 × 100 m freestyle relays.

References

External links

 
 
 
 
 
 

1989 births
Living people
People from Dessau-Roßlau
German female freestyle swimmers
German female swimmers
Olympic swimmers of Germany
Swimmers at the 2012 Summer Olympics
World Aquatics Championships medalists in swimming
European Aquatics Championships medalists in swimming
Sportspeople from Saxony-Anhalt
20th-century German women
21st-century German women